The 2019–20 Maryland Eastern Shore Hawks men's basketball team represented the University of Maryland Eastern Shore in the 2019–20 NCAA Division I men's basketball season. The Hawks, led by first-year head coach Jason Crafton, played their home games at the Hytche Athletic Center in Princess Anne, Maryland as members of the Mid-Eastern Athletic Conference. They finished the season 5–27, 4–12 in MEAC play to finish in a tie for ninth place. They lost in the first round of the MEAC tournament to Delaware State.

Previous season
The Hawks finished the 2018–19 season 7–25 overall, 5–11 in MEAC play, finishing in a tie for 9th place. In the MEAC tournament, they lost to South Carolina State in the first round.

On April 24, 2019, it was announced that Jason Crafton, assistant coach of the Delaware Blue Coats, the NBA G League affiliate of the Philadelphia 76ers, would be named head coach, meaning that the team would not retain interim head coach Clifford Reed.

Roster

Schedule and results

|-
!colspan=12 style=| Exhibition

|-
!colspan=12 style=| Non-conference regular season

|-
!colspan=9 style=| MEAC regular season

|-
!colspan=12 style=| MEAC tournament
|-

|-

Source

References

Maryland Eastern Shore Hawks men's basketball seasons
Maryland Eastern Shore Hawks
Maryland Eastern Shore Hawks men's basketball
Maryland Eastern Shore Hawks men's basketball